Ramparts of Clay, is a 1971 French drama film directed by Jean-Louis Bertuccelli. The film stars Leila Shenna, as well as the villagers of the Algerian village of Tehouda. The film was selected as the French entry for the Best Foreign Language Film at the 44th Academy Awards, but was not accepted as a nominee.

The film tells the story of a young woman (played by Shenna), who tries to free herself from the role imposed on her by the village culture. The film explores the exploitation of the rural Tunisian people, although it was filmed in an Algerian village.

Cast
 Leila Shenna as Young Woman

See also
 List of submissions to the 44th Academy Awards for Best Foreign Language Film
 List of French submissions for the Academy Award for Best Foreign Language Film

References
Martin, Mick & Porter, Marsha DVD & Video Guide 2006, pg. 923

External links
 

1971 films
French docudrama films
1970s French-language films
1971 drama films
Films directed by Jean-Louis Bertuccelli
1970s French films